The Arctic hare (Lepus arcticus) is a species of hare highly adapted to living in the Arctic tundra and other icy biomes. The Arctic hare survives with shortened ears and limbs, a small nose, fat that makes up close to 20% of its body, and a thick coat of fur. It usually digs holes in the ground or under the snow to keep warm and to sleep. Arctic hares look like rabbits but have shorter ears, are taller when standing, and, unlike rabbits, can thrive in extreme cold. They can travel together with many other hares, sometimes huddling with dozens or more, but are usually found alone, sometimes taking more than one partner.

Taxonomy

Arctic explorer John Ross described the Arctic hare in 1819.

Description
The Arctic hare is one of the largest living lagomorphs.

Distribution and habitat
The Arctic hare is distributed over the northernmost regions of Greenland, the Canadian Arctic islands and Northern Canada, including Ellesmere Island, and farther south in Labrador and Newfoundland. The Arctic hare is well adapted to conditions found in the tundras, plateaus, and treeless coasts of this region, including cold weather and frozen precipitation.

In Newfoundland and Southern Labrador, the Arctic hare changes its coat color, moulting and growing new fur, from brown or grey in the summer to white in the winter. This seasonal moulting also enables other Arctic animals, including ermine and ptarmigan, to remain camouflaged as the environment changes. However, the Arctic hares in the far north of Canada, where summer is very short, remain white all year round.

Feeding
The Arctic hare is a herbivore, specifically a folivore. Arctic hares feed primarily on woody plants, with arctic willow constituting 95% of their diet year-round. Arctic hares predominantly consume saxifrage, crowberry, and dwarf willow, but can also eat a variety of other foods, including lichens and mosses, blooms, other species' leaves, twigs, and roots, mountain sorrel and macroalgae (seaweed). Arctic hare diets are more diverse in summer. Although previously believed to still be primarily willow, dryas, and grasses, recent studies show that their diet becomes dominated by legumes, constituting 70% of their diet in the summer. Arctic hares have been reported to occasionally eat meat, including fish and the stomach contents of eviscerated caribou. They eat snow to get water.

Physiology 
The Arctic hare has many physiological features that are adaptive to its extreme environment. Despite a 17% - 38% lower than expected basal metabolic rate, the Arctic hare is able to maintain a body temperature comparable to other lagomorphs (38.9 degrees C) because of its low surface area to volume ratio and high insulation. The lowered metabolic rate also allows the Arctic hare to save energy, making it adaptive for its cold and barren habitat. In addition, the Arctic hare has high locomotive efficiency combined with long periods of resting and shorter bouts of foraging which enables it to conserve energy and survive on its low diet intake.

The white fur of Arctic hares, in addition to their camouflage benefits in the winter, have a high reflectance which may prevent excessive heat gain during the day. Behaviorally, the Arctic hare keeps warm in winter using body orientation, posture, and seeking or digging shelter. When resting, Arctic hares maintain a nearly spherical shape and typically stay in groups, but do not huddle. If the rabbits are solitary, they often rest in the shelter of large rocks protecting them from the wind and staying out of sight of predators. In addition to rocks, Arctic hares also find shelter in other natural shelters such as snowdrifts, man-made structures, and even digging their own burrows in snowdrifts up to 188 cm in length.

The body size of Arctic hares is often significantly less in the winter compared to the summer, likely caused by decreased food quality and availability in addition to a decreased metabolic rate. Arctic hare body mass might also be affected by ambient temperature. At lower latitudes it was found that Arctic hares in Greenland exhibited larger body size with increased temperature, possibly caused by increased energy availability to contribute to body size and increased food plant availability. The opposite is true at higher latitudes in which Arctic hares had smaller body sizes with increased temperature. This trend is again linked to food plant availability. In this case, decreased precipitation and increased temperatures in the higher latitudes of Greenland result in a lower food plant availability to contribute to body mass.

Reproduction and lifespan

Breeding season occurs around April or May. Gestation period of the Arctic hare is 53 days, so the babies are born around May, June, or July. Hares can have up to eight babies (average litter size 5.4), called leverets. The leverets stay within the mother's home range until they can survive on their own. Young Arctic hares are almost full size by late July (some weeks after birth) and breed for the first time after a year of age.

There is little information on the lifespan of Arctic hares. Some anecdotal evidence suggests they live three to five years in the wild. Arctic hares do not fare well in captivity, living only a year and a half at most.

Predators
Known predators of the Arctic hare are the Arctic fox (Vulpes lagopus), Red fox (Vulpes vulpes), Wolf (Canis lupus), Lynx (Lynx canadensis), Ermine (Mustela erminea), Snowy owl (Bubo scandiacus), Gyrfalcon (Falco rusticolus), Rough-legged hawk (Buteo lagopus) and occasionally humans.

The Arctic wolf is probably the most successful predator of the Arctic hare, and even young wolves in their first autumn can catch adult hares. Arctic foxes and ermines, which are smaller, typically prey on young hares. Gyrfalcon carry hares to their nests, cutting them in half first; gyrfalcons use hare bones and feet in the structure of their nests on Ellesmere Island, Nunavut. Peregrine falcons (Falco peregrinus) also prey on Arctic hares in the southern end of the hares' range. The snowy owls mainly target young hares; the French common name of the species derives from Anglo-Saxon harfang ("hare-catcher").

Four groups of parasites have been known to use Arctic hares as a host: protozoans (Eimeria exigua, Eimeria magna, Eimeria perforans, and Eimeria sculpta); nematodes (including Filaria and Oxyuris ambigua); lice (including Haemodipsus lyriocephalus and Haemodipsus setoni) and fleas (including Hoplopsyllus glacialis, Euhoplopsyllus glacialis, and Megabothris groenlandicus. Fleas are more common than parasitic worms.

Subspecies

There are four subspecies of this hare:
Lepus arcticus arcticus
Lepus arcticus banksii
Lepus arcticus groenlandicus
Lepus arcticus monstrabilis

References

Lepus
Mammals of North America
Mammals of Canada
Mammals of Greenland
Mammals of the Arctic
Hare, Arctic
Mammals described in 1819
Folivores